Daniel Courtenay Woodman (July 8, 1893 – December 14, 1962) was a professional baseball pitcher. He played parts of two seasons in Major League Baseball, 1914 and 1915, for the Buffalo Buffeds/Blues of the Federal League.

External links

Major League Baseball pitchers
Buffalo Buffeds players
Buffalo Blues players
Fall River Adopted Sons players
Springfield Tips players
New Haven Profs players
Pittsfield Hillies players
Hartford Senators players
New Haven Bulldogs players
Baseball players from Massachusetts
People from Danvers, Massachusetts
1893 births
1962 deaths
Sportspeople from Essex County, Massachusetts